Bowmanville Zoo was a zoo in Clarington, Ontario, Canada. Founded in 1919, at the time of its closure, in 2016, it was the oldest private zoo in North America. It was a large supplier of animals to the U.S. film industry.

About 100,000 people visited the zoo each year, a figure which dropped by more than two thirds in its final year. The Bowmanville Zoo officially closed on 10 October 2016.

History
The land now occupied by the zoo, on the banks of Soper Creek, was part of the grounds of the Cream of Barley Mill, located further south on the creek. The mill owner developed a campground and park for tourists, aptly named "The Cream of Barley Campground", on the part of the property that was near the highway. Later, a petting zoo was added to the park.

By 1928, the mill, camp, and park (which now included tourist cabins) were owned by James Morden and operated by Alfred Shrubb, formerly a world-renowned long-distance runner. By 1946, the park included tennis courts.

Over time, the zoo aspect of the business became more prominent, and the cabins were turned into animal shelters and storage buildings.

Toronto native Michael Hackenberger was the final owner of the Bowmanville Zoo. In April 2016, Hackenberger was charged with 5 counts of animal abuse by the Ontario Society for the Prevention of Cruelty to Animals (OSPCA) due to a video obtained by PETA of Hackenberger whipping a young leashed tiger profusely while swearing at it.

Animals

Some of the animal talent included:
 Baghera, the black jaguar from Peter Benchley's Amazon
 a bevy of camels from The 13th Warrior starring Antonio Banderas
 Ron and Julie, siblings hybrid Bengal/Siberian tiger starring in the Discovery Channel/Animal Planet documentary, Living with Tigers
 Caesar, the African lion from Rude and The Ghost and the Darkness along with his brother Bongo 
 Billy, the white Bengal tiger from the TV series Animorphs
 the late Bongo, the African lion from the movies The Ghost and the Darkness, George of the Jungle, Rude, and from the TV series Animorphs 
 Maggie the Macaque, known for her Stanley Cup Playoffs predictions
 Jonas, the Bengal tiger from the film adaptation of Life of Pi
 Robbie, a Siberian tiger from the controversial 2014 film The Interview

Elephants
The zoo once had seven elephants with a mix of African and Asian.

Limba was the lone Asian elephant at the zoo; she arrived in 1989 and was euthanized in late 2013 at the age of 50 after a malignant tumor was found in her abdomen. The pachyderm was well known for appearing in Bowmanville's annual Santa Claus Parade and several movies. With her death and closure of Toronto Zoo's elephant exhibit, the only zoo in Ontario with elephants is the African Lion Safari.

Traveling exhibits
Animals from the Bowmanville Zoo are sometimes displayed as part of shows in various parts of Canada.

Two camels, Shawn and Todd, along with Jonas the tiger, went missing for two days on the way home from one of these trips when their trailer, along with the truck pulling it, was stolen near Drummondville, Quebec in 2010.  All three were found in good health and returned to the zoo.

Programs
The zoo participated in breeding programs for endangered species, and also accepted retired circus animals.

Controversy
In December 2015, the Bowmanville Zoo owner, Michael Hackenberger was accused by People for the Ethical Treatment of Animals (PETA) of animal cruelty. PETA released a video taken secretly which showed Hackenberger cursing and cracking a whip numerous times at a young Siberian tiger named Uno.

In response to PETA's allegations, Hackenberger released his own video statement. In it, he asserts that although his "language is atrocious and I apologize for that," "PETA, once again, is lying." He stated that only two of the 19 cracks of the whip shown in the video struck the tiger, with the remainder striking either the air or the ground immediately adjacent to the tiger. He also challenged PETA to release the full length of the video taken.

Earlier in 2015, Hackenberger was filmed on live television swearing at a baboon for failing to complete a trick, which involved its jumping off the back of a miniature pony.

On 13 April 2016, as a result of the video of Michael Hackenberger whipping the leashed tiger, five animal cruelty charges were brought against him. The Ontario Society for the Prevention of Cruelty to Animals says it began investigating alleged abuse at the Bowmanville Zoo immediately after reviewing the footage that emerged in December. The agency said the zoo's owner, Michael Hackenberger, was charged with four counts of causing an animal distress; causing an animal distress by striking the animal with a whip handle, causing an animal distress by repeatedly striking an animal with a whip, causing an animal to be in distress by striking the animal in the face with a whip, and causing an animal distress by pushing his thumb into the animals eye. The last charge was one of failing to comply with the prescribed standards of care for an animal. Three of the distress charges relate to the use of a whip, and one related to Hackenberger pushing his thumb into the tigers eye. The OSPCA said it would continue to conduct inspections of the zoo and continue to closely monitor the animals there.

On 23 March 2017, the charges against Michael Hackenberger were judicially stayed. They were automatically withdrawn a year later, on 23 March 2018.

Closure 
On 23 June 2016, the zoo announced that it would close its doors at the end of the 2016 season, just three years short of its 100-year anniversary which was to occur in 2019. Zoo officials announced that the closure would occur as a result of financial issues caused by a catastrophic decline in attendance following the zoo's owner being charged with animal cruelty. The zoo officially closed its doors on 10 October 2016.

In 2017 the property re-opened as Clarington Family Outdoor Adventure Park and still featured lions and some staff from previous operations.

Plans are currently underway to transform the zoo property into a large municipal park.

Notes

External links 
 Official site

Buildings and structures in Clarington
Zoos in Ontario
Tourist attractions in the Regional Municipality of Durham
Former zoos
1919 establishments in Ontario
2016 disestablishments in Ontario
Zoos established in 1919
Zoos disestablished in 2016